This article lists the India national football team managers, the post which was incorporated in 1938 with the appointment of Pankaj Gupta for their tour to Australia. Balaidas Chatterjee became the first manager of the national team in post-independent India, who guided the nation at the 1948 Summer Olympics in London.

Overview
Since India's independence, there have been twenty-nine different head coaches for the national team, out of which eleven foreign. The most successful head coach for India was Syed Abdul Rahim, who led India to gold in both the 1951 and 1962 Asian Games while also achieving a fourth-place finish during the 1956 Summer Olympics. The most successful foreign head coaches for India were Bob Houghton and Stephen Constantine; both of them helped the team to qualify for AFC Asian Cup. With Houghton in charge from 2006 to 2011, 

India won the Nehru Cup twice and the AFC Challenge Cup in 2008 which allowed India to participate in their first AFC Asian Cup for 27 years. Since Houghton resigned as India team Head coach in 2011, the India national team's FIFA ranking touched its lowest at 173 in the team history in March 2015, but Constantine, who was appointed for the second time as the head coach of India, revived the Indian team from its meagre condition. Under him, the team remained unbeaten for two years from June 2016 to March 2018 winning 11 matches and drawn 2 matches, which helped them to qualify for 2019 AFC Asian Cup after 8 years since Houghton left. He also helped the team to reach a better FIFA ranking of 96 in July 2017, which was the best in last 21 years.

List of managers

Managers in italics took charge as caretaker or interim manager

 Pankaj Gupta (1938)
 Balaidas Chatterjee (1948) 
 Syed Abdul Rahim (1951–1952)
 Balaidas Chatterjee (1953)
 Syed Abdul Rahim (1954)
 Balaidas Chatterjee (1954)
 Bert Flatley (1955)
 Saroj Bose (1955)
 Syed Abdul Rahim (1956–1962)
 T. Shome (1958)
 Sailendra Nath Manna (1961)
 G. M. Pentiah (1963)
 Harry Wright (1964)
 Mohammed Hussain (1964–1967)
 Sachindranath Mitra (1966)
 S. R. Deb (1967)
 Sailendra Nath Manna (1968)
 Jarnail Singh (1969)
 G. M. H. Basha (1970–1971)
 P. K. Banerjee (1971–1974)
 J. Krishnaswamy (1974)
 G. M. H. Basha (1975)
 Jarnail Singh (1976)
 Sahu Mewalal (1977)
 G. M. H. Basha (1977)
 Arun Ghosh (1978)
 Jarnail Singh (1980)
 P. K. Banerjee (1981–1982)
 Bob Bootland (1982)
 Muhammad Salaam (1983)
 Joe Kinnear (1983)
 Milovan Ćirić (1983–1985)
 Arun Ghosh (1984)
 Arun Ghosh (1985)
 P. K. Banerjee (1985–1986)
 Syed Nayeemuddin (1987−1989)
 Amal Dutta (1987)
 Anjan Chowdhury (1989)
 József Gelei (1990–1991)
 Derek D'Souza (1992–1993)
 Jiří Pešek (1993−1994)
 Rustam Akramov (1995−1996)
 Syed Nayeemuddin (1997–1998)
 Sukhwinder Singh (1999–2001)
 Islam Ahmedov (2001)
 Stephen Constantine (2002–2005)
 Sukhwinder Singh (2005)
 Syed Nayeemuddin (2005–2006)
 Bob Houghton (2006–2011)
 Armando Colaco (2011)
 Savio Medeira (2011–2012)
 Wim Koevermans (2012–2015)
 Stephen Constantine (2015–2019)
 Igor Štimac (2019−present)

Managerial records
Only senior FIFA A matches considered.
List also includes managers who took charge of the national team in senior unofficial matches.
"Period" indicates the timespan of the first and last matches in charge, which may include periods not in charge of the national team

See also

 History of the India national football team

References

Lists of national association football team managers